The rusty-cheeked scimitar babbler (Erythrogenys erythrogenys) is a species of bird in the family Timaliidae native to South-East Asia.

Subspecies
Erythrogenys erythrogenys has a number of recognized subspecies:
 E. e. erythrogenys (northwest Himalayas)
 E. e. imberbis
 E. e. haringtoni
 E. e. gravivox
 E. e. macclellandi
 E. e. ferrugilatus (central Himalayas from Nepal to Bhutan)
 E. e. imberbis (east Myanmar) 
 E. e. celata (east Myanmar and northeast Thailand)

Description
The species is olive-brown above with rusty coluring on the sides of the face, head, thighs, and flanks. The belly is mostly white. Sexes are alike. The beak is long and decurved in a scimitar shape.

Distribution and habitat
The rusty-cheeked scimitar babbler is found from the Himalayas to Myanmar. It inhabits subtropical or tropical moist lowland forest and subtropical or tropical moist montane forest habitats at elevations up to 2600 m.

Ecology
The bird feeds mostly on the forest floor and in low canopy, forming small groups. Food items include insects, grubs and seeds. Calls consist of a mellow, fluty whistle, a two-noted "CUE..PE...CUE..pe" call followed by single note replay by mate, guttural alarm calls and a liquid contact note. The species is generally quite noisy.

References

Further reading
 Collar, N. J. & Robson, C. 2007. Family Timaliidae (Babblers)  pp. 70 – 291 in; del Hoyo, J., Elliott, A. & Christie, D.A. eds. Handbook of the Birds of the World, Vol. 12. Picathartes to Tits and Chickadees. Lynx Edicions, Barcelona.

rusty-cheeked scimitar babbler
Birds of Pakistan
Birds of North India
Birds of Nepal
Birds of Bhutan
Birds of Northeast India
Birds of Myanmar
rusty-cheeked scimitar babbler
Taxonomy articles created by Polbot